The Bachelor is an American dating and relationship reality television series that debuted on March 25, 2002, on ABC. For its first 25 seasons, the show was hosted by Chris Harrison. As the flagship of the original The Bachelor franchise, its success resulted in several spin-offs including The Bachelorette, Bachelor Pad,  Bachelor in Paradise, Bachelor in Paradise: After Paradise, The Bachelor Winter Games, The Bachelor Presents: Listen to Your Heart, and The Bachelor: The Greatest Seasons – Ever!, as well as spawning many international editions of the shows.

On September 28, 2021, the series was renewed for a twenty-sixth season with season five bachelor Jesse Palmer returning to the Bachelor franchise, this time as host. On May 13, 2022, ABC renewed the series for a twenty-seventh season.

Production
The series was created by Mike Fleiss. The After The Final Rose and other reunion specials were originally produced at Victory Studios in Los Angeles, California, and CBS Studio Center in Studio City, but are now taped at Warner Bros. Studios in Burbank. In the most recent run of The Bachelor it brought in almost $86 million in advertising revenue.

Plot
The series revolves around a single bachelor who begins with a pool of romantic interests to whom he is expected to select a fiancé. During the course of the season, the bachelor eliminates candidates (see The elimination process) each week eventually culminating in a marriage proposal to his final selection. The participants travel to romantic and exotic locations for their dates, and the conflicts in the series, both internal and external, stem from the elimination-style format of the show.

The above description is simply a general guideline. In practice, the show does not always follow its designed structure, and those variations are often a source of drama and conflict. They may include, among other events:
An eliminated candidate returning to the show to plead her case to the bachelor
A non-contestant, usually with history in the franchise, pleads to be considered as a candidate for the bachelor
A bachelor distributing more or fewer roses than planned
A bachelor eliminating a woman outside of the normal elimination process. For example, the bachelor may eliminate both women on a two-on-one date
The bachelor chooses to pursue a relationship with his final selection rather than propose marriage

Season six was the only season to feature a twist in casting. Since producers could not decide between Byron Velvick and Jay Overbye for the next Bachelor, the 25 women at the time participating had to decide which bachelor would make the best husband. At the end of the first episode, Velvick was chosen.

Notable cases where the bachelor violated the premise of the show are Brad Womack, who selected neither of his final two women on his first season, and Jason Mesnick, who broke off his engagement in the After the Final Rose episode and several months later proposed (offscreen) to the first runner-up (Molly Malaney)—who he later married. Like Mesnick, Arie Luyendyk Jr. also broke off his engagement and during the After the Final Rose episode, he proposed to the first runner-up (Lauren Burnham)—to whom he is now married.

Setting
The custom home, built in 2005, is located on 10 acres at 2351 Kanan Road, and it is owned by Marshall Haraden. As of October 10, 2008, the home was listed for sale at a price of US$8.75 million. The final third of the episodes within a season are filmed traveling the world. Episodes have been filmed throughout the United States, Canada, England, New Zealand, Vietnam, Thailand, and Korea to name just a few locations. The Agoura Hills, California mansion became the primary residence for the contestants since the eleventh season though it was not used in seasons eight and nine, where they mainly shot in Paris and Rome, respectively. During the COVID-19 pandemic, the mansion was strictly restricted for filming purposes in season 25, the contestants being housed on the isolated bubble at Nemacolin Woodlands Resort in Farmington, Pennsylvania.

The elimination process
On each Bachelor episode, the bachelor interacts with the women and presents a rose to each woman he wishes to remain on the show. Those who do not receive a rose are eliminated. Eliminations are based upon the bachelor's personal feelings about each contestant, guided primarily by the impression made by each woman during dates or other events of the week. Most roses are presented at a rose ceremony at the end of each episode, but roses can also be bestowed on dates. However, if a contestant went on a 1 on 1 date with the Bachelor or Bachelorette, they have to receive a rose. If they do not receive one, then they will have to go home immediately.  Typical activities include:
group date: the bachelor and a group of women participate in an activity. Sometimes the activity takes the form of a competition, the winner or winners spending more time with the bachelor. The bachelor typically presents a rose to the woman who makes the best impression during the group date.
One-on-one date: the bachelor and one woman go on a date. Except in the late stages of the season, there is a rose at stake: At the end of the date, the bachelor must decide whether to present the woman a rose. If the woman does not receive a rose, she is eliminated immediately.

If a rose is at stake on a date, the participating women pack their suitcases in case they fail to receive a rose. The other women learn that a woman has been eliminated when that woman's suitcase is taken away by a crew member.
Except in the late stages of the season, the episode concludes with a cocktail party, to which the bachelor and all women not yet eliminated are invited. At the first cocktail party of the season, the bachelor presents a "first impression rose"; roses are typically not presented at any other cocktail parties.
Every episode concludes with a rose ceremony which has its own conventions.
The women who have not been eliminated stand in rows at one end of the room, and the bachelor faces them. The bachelor has a tray with roses.
The bachelor takes a rose and calls a woman by name. The woman steps forward, and the bachelor asks, "Will you accept this rose?" The woman accepts, takes the rose, and returns to her original position.
When there is one rose remaining, host Jesse Palmer says, "Ladies, this is the final rose tonight," then tells the bachelor, "When you're ready."
After all roses are distributed, host Jesse Palmer tells the women who did not receive a rose, "Ladies, take a moment and say your good-byes."

The final episodes of each season traditionally follow this pattern:
The bachelor visits the home towns and families of each of the four remaining women. At the rose ceremony, one woman is eliminated, leaving three.
The bachelor and the three remaining women travel to an exotic location for a series of one-on-one dates. At the conclusion of each date, the bachelor offers the woman the keys to the fantasy suite which allows the two to spend the night together without cameras present. At the rose ceremony, one woman is eliminated, leaving two.
In a "The Women Tell All" episode, the women who had been eliminated from the show participate in a talk show where they discuss their thoughts and experiences.
The two remaining women separately meet with the bachelor's family. At the end of the episode, one woman eventually exits the limo and is sent home, followed by the second woman who the bachelor proposes to by presenting the "final rose".
In an After the Final Rose episode which immediately follows, the bachelor, the finalist, and the runner-up participate in a talk show. The identity of the next season's bachelor or bachelorette is often announced at the end of the episode.

A woman may withdraw from the competition at any time if she finds herself no longer interested in the bachelor. On rare occasions, a woman is removed from the show for breaking one of the rules.

The bachelor has wide discretion in choosing how many and when to present the roses. For example, Sean Lowe presented several roses at his initial cocktail party.

It is common to accuse a contestant of not being on the show "for the right reasons", meaning that her aim is not to establish a relationship with the bachelor, but rather to garner publicity for her own career, induce jealousy in an ex-boyfriend, become selected as the next Bachelorette, or simply to get free trips to exotic locations.

Seasons

Ratings

Notes

Questions of authenticity
On February 26, 2009, in an exclusive interview between The Bachelor season 13 contestant Megan Parris, and Steve Carbone, Megan commented that the producers edit the footage to create a fictional storyline:

On March 26, 2009, Megan Parris argued that not only was the show scripted, but that producers bullied contestants into saying things to the camera that contestants did not want to say. "There's nothing real about it," she said of the show's trademark "confessionals," in which contestants talk to the camera about the latest goings-on. "It is scripted," she said. "They basically will call you names, berate you, curse at you until they get you to say what they want you to say." Both ABC and Warner Bros., the studio that produces The Bachelor, had no comment.

On March 15, 2010, Mike Fleiss appeared on 20/20 and said that he develops contestants into characters that will cater to his audience's tastes and that they "need [their] fair share of villains every season." Fleiss has come under fire for admitting that The Bachelor has less to do with reality than it does making good television.

On February 24, 2012, during the taping of The Women Tell All episode of The Bachelor, a private conversation between contestant Courtney Robertson and a show producer went public when microphones were accidentally left on in between camera takes. The conversation revealed the producer had a role as a coach, encouraging Robertson to fake certain emotions for the camera.

The audience reactions for The Women Tell All episode are pre-recorded and inserted into the show later.

Lawsuits

In December 2011, a producer of The Bachelor sued Steve Carbone, the proprietor of the website RealitySteve.com, for leaking unreleased information about the show, claiming Carbone encouraged contestants of both The Bachelor and The Bachelorette to break their confidentiality agreements. Carbone has denied that the source of the leaks are current contestants. Despite the first two lawsuits in 2012 being settled out of court, a further lawsuit was presented against Carbone in 2017.

Criticism

The franchise has long been criticized for its lack of ethnic and cultural diversity, eventually prompting petitions and threats of boycott from the franchise's only black lead at the time, Rachel Lindsay.
In June 2020, the show cast Matt James as its first black male lead for season 25. James was initially cast for Clare Crawley's season of Bachelorette, which was delayed due to COVID−19. In June 2021, it was announced that long-time host Chris Harrison was stepping down permanently after widespread criticism of comments he had made which excused the past behavior of a cast member who had been accused of racism, saying he was not the "woke police". Harrison acknowledged, "By excusing historical racism, I defended it."

The show has been criticized for stigmatizing virginity, thus reflecting the patriarchal masculinity stereotypes. (The target of anti-virginity stigma, Colton Underwood, came out as gay in 2021.)

Spin-offs
The program's success has led to the creation of various spin-off series;
The Bachelorette premiered in 2003 as a female counterpart of The Bachelor, featuring a pool of men competing for a single bachelorette (who is usually a former contestant of The Bachelor). The series first ran from 2003 to 2005, before returning in 2008 after a hiatus.
Bachelor Pad ran from 2010 to 2012, featuring previous contestants of The Bachelor and The Bachelorette competing in challenges and eliminations to for a chance to win a $250,000 grand prize. In 2013, it was replaced by a similar series, Bachelor in Paradise. 
 The fourth season of Bachelor in Paradise called into question about the future of its production following an issue of possible misconduct on the set. The fourth season premiered on August 8, 2017. Two contestants, Corinne Olympios and DeMario Jackson were involved in an explicit sexual encounter in the pool during the filming of the show and were caught on tape. A producer onset administered a complaint which stated either one or both contestants may have been too drunk to give proper consent for the sexual encounter. This prompted Warner Bros. to start an internal investigation and both contestants to seek legal counsel. Production of the show was halted on June 11, 2017, and all contestants were asked to go home until further notice. Allegations were made against both contestants about their intoxication and actions thereafter, but ended with broadcast statements from both contestants during a talk show that it was all a misunderstanding and the two have remained friends since the incident. The show was given the green light to resume filming on June 21, 2017; neither Olympios nor Jackson returned to production.
 The weddings of Trista Rehn (the 1st Bachelorette), Jason Mesnick (13th Bachelor), Ashley Hebert (the 7th Bachelorette), and Sean Lowe (the 17th Bachelor) were broadcast as television specials. Rehn's vow-renewal ceremony upon her 10-year anniversary was also broadcast. Bachelor in Paradise season 2 couple Jade Roper and Tanner Tolbert's wedding was also broadcast as a television special in February 2016.
 Sister network Freeform premiered two docusoaps focusing on alumni from the series, Ben and Lauren: Happily Ever After? premiered in October 2016, which showcased the relationship of Ben Higgins and Lauren Bushnell following season 20 of The Bachelor on their plans for marriage and Bushnell's new life in Denver. But then, the couple eventually parted ways on May 15, 2017. In March 2017, Freeform premiered The Twins: Happily Ever After, which featured Haley and Emily Ferguson from season 20 of The Bachelor.
The Bachelor Winter Games premiered on February 13, 2018, as a winter sports-themed spin-off (airing against the 2018 Winter Olympics), with a similar format to Bachelor in Paradise featuring contestants from domestic and international alumni of the franchise, and winter sports challenges. The series was won by Ashley Iaconetti (United States) and Kevin Wendt (Canada), after finishing first in a figure skating competition among the final four couples. In 2020, ABC announced plans to produce a summer counterpart—The Bachelor Summer Games—which would have presumably aired against the 2020 Summer Olympics. On March 30, 2020, due to the COVID-19 pandemic (which itself caused the 2020 Olympics to be postponed to 2021), it was reported that the series had been cancelled and would not be part of the 2020–21 TV season.
Bachelor Live was a short-live after-show hosted by Chris Harrison discussing events in episodes of season 20 with cast members and celebrity fans.
Bachelor Live On Stage was announced on January 23, 2019, during the Men Tell All episode. A local Bachelor would go through group date challenges and coveted one-on-ones with local ladies in the audience. Audience members and hosts would assist the Bachelor. Ben Higgins and Becca Kufrin are slated to host the planned 63 stop tour starting in Mesa, Arizona on February 13, 2020, with the tour interrupted in Minneapolis, Minnesota on March 11, 2020. The COVID-19 pandemic caused subsequent shows have been postponed including the scheduled final stop in Austin, Texas on May 17, 2020, the dates were initially rescheduled to January 24, 2021, in Cleveland, Ohio before postponed for the second time in 2022 due to the temporary closure of entertainment venues and the second wave of the virus in late 2020. It was announced on October 27, 2021, that it would resume on March 16, 2022, in Peoria, Illinois after more than two years of entertainment closures in related to the pandemic. Kufrin returned as host and now be the sole host of the show. In February 2022, it was announced that former Bachelorette contestants James Bonsall (season 17), Rick Leach (season 18), Connor Brennan (season 17), Ivan Hall (season 16), Justin Glaze (season 17), Andrew Spencer (season 17), and Rodney Matthews (season 18) would all be joining the tour as special guests for different tour stops.
The Bachelor Presents: Listen to Your Heart premiered on April 13, 2020, which featured a cast of musicians and related figures, participating in music-related challenges and dates.
 The Bachelor: The Greatest Seasons – Ever!, aired in 2020 as a replacement for The Bachelorette due to the COVID-19 pandemic, featuring recaps of previous seasons.

Parodies
The novelty of the show makes it a ripe target for parody.

Ben Stiller produced a web spoof of the series titled Burning Love.

In 2013, ABC's late-night talk show Jimmy Kimmel Live! has parodied the series as The Baby Bachelor, a sketch where the titular role is given to host Jimmy Kimmel's three-year-old nephew Wesley. Later episodes featured follow-up sketches with similar parodies of The Bachelorette and Bachelor in Paradise.

The Fox network produced a show, Joe Millionaire, based on the premise that the bachelor was a millionaire heir, when in reality, he was not.

On June 1, 2015, Lifetime began airing Unreal, a scripted drama about a producer who works on Everlasting, a fictional reality series similar to The Bachelor. It is based on Sarah Gertrude Shapiro's short film Sequin Raze and her experience as a field producer on The Bachelor.

The series was parodied in the third season of the reality series RuPaul's Drag Race All Stars as "The Bitchelor", where a titular challenge featured the drag performers portraying contestants on a Bachelor-like show with Jeffrey Bowyer-Chapman playing the bachelor.

See also

Who Wants to Marry a Multi-Millionaire? (2000)
Joe Millionaire (2003)
The Littlest Groom (2004)
Momma's Boys (2008)
More to Love (2009)

Notes

References

External links

The Bachelor at Yahoo! TVYahoo! Smart TV
The Bachelor at VH1
The Bachelor at abc.com

2000s American game shows
2000s American reality television series
2002 American television series debuts
2010s American reality television series
2010s American game shows
2020s American game shows
2020s American reality television series
American Broadcasting Company original programming
American dating and relationship reality television series
English-language television shows
Race-related controversies in television
Television series by Warner Bros. Television Studios
Television series by Warner Horizon Television